The Federispitz (1,865 m) is a mountain of the Appenzell Alps, overlooking the Walensee in the canton of St. Gallen. It lies south of the Speer above the municipality of Schänis.

References

External links

Federispitz on Hikr

Mountains of Switzerland
Mountains of the canton of St. Gallen
Mountains of the Alps
Appenzell Alps